On 21 June 2012, a Fokker F27 military transport aircraft of the Indonesian Air Force crashed into a housing complex near Halim Airport in Jakarta, Indonesia, while conducting a training flight. All seven people on board were killed; four people on the ground were also killed, and 11 more injured.

Accident
The F27 was on a training flight when it crashed while trying to land. Officials previously said that the aircraft crew had been conducting a touch-and-go exercise before the crash. The aircraft was not equipped with flight data recorders.

Aircraft
The plane was built in 1958 and used by Air Force for the past several years. TNI has said that it is in the process of procuring CN-295s to replace its Fokker F27s.

References

External links
 

Aviation accidents and incidents in Indonesia
Accidents and incidents involving the Fokker F27
Aviation accidents and incidents in 2012
2012 in Indonesia
Accidents and incidents involving military aircraft
June 2012 events in Asia